is a former Japan Davis Cup team player and tour tennis player.

A native of Ishikawa Prefecture, Kamiwazumi competed in sixteen Grand Slam tennis events between 1972 and 1976. His best singles result was reaching the final 32 in the 1973 U.S. Open. His biggest grand slam tourney win was a first round defeat of No. 7 seed Stan Smith in the 1974 French Open. In doubles, he reached the round of 16 at the 1971 French Open, partnering compatriot Toshiro Sakai.

Kamiwazumi's biggest grand prix result was reaching the semi-finals in Hilversum in 1971, where despite going up two sets he lost the match to Ross Case. The following year at the same event he reached the quarter-finals, as he did in Cincinnati in 1972, Cincinnati and Hilversum both in 1974, and the Tokyo Outdoor in 1979. He finished with a tour win–loss singles record of 55 and 93 and a career-high ranking of World No. 78, which he reached in February, 1975. The right-handed resident of Tokyo best doubles results were reaching the final of the Osaka Grand Prix in 1973, partnering Aussie legend Ken Rosewall, as well as the Denver WCT final in 1974, partnering Mark Cox.

Kamiwazumi is tied for the most years played on the Japanese Davis Cup team, 12, a record he shares with Gouichi Motomura. He posted 12 wins against 8 losses in singles and went 8 and 8 in doubles, in a total of 20 ties played in. Kamiwazumi partnered Sakai against Mal Anderson and Geoff Masters in the 1972 Eastern Zone, Zone A final. Australia won the tie 4–1 in what turned out to be Japan's final appearance in a zonal final round until the format was changed to having a World Group, beginning in 1981.

After retirement Kamiwazumi became a tennis television commentator, university lecturer, television personality, and Japanese Davis Cup coach.

Career finals

Doubles (2 losses)

References

External links
 
 
 

1947 births
Living people
Japanese academics
Japanese male tennis players
Japanese sports announcers
Japanese tennis coaches
Japanese television personalities
Tennis commentators
Universiade gold medalists for Japan
Universiade silver medalists for Japan
Universiade medalists in tennis
Medalists at the 1967 Summer Universiade
Medalists at the 1970 Summer Universiade
Hosei University alumni
Sportspeople from Ishikawa Prefecture
Sportspeople from Tokyo